The People We Hate at the Wedding is a 2022 American comedy film directed by Claire Scanlon from a screenplay by the Molyneux sisters, based on the 2016 novel of the same name by Grant Ginder. It stars Allison Janney, Ben Platt, Cynthia Addai-Robinson, and Kristen Bell.

The film was released on November 18, 2022, by Amazon Studios.

Plot
Struggling American siblings Alice and Paul reluctantly agree to attend the wedding of their estranged, wealthy half-sister, Eloise, in the English countryside alongside their mother, Donna.

Cast

Production
The People We Hate at the Wedding is a comedy written by the Molyneux sisters as an adaptation of the 2016 novel of the same name by Grant Ginder. The feature film from Amazon Studios and FilmNation Entertainment was announced in March 2021, when Allison Janney, Annie Murphy, and Ben Platt were cast and it was reported Claire Scanlon was set to direct. In July 2021, Kristen Bell joined the cast to replace Murphy. Production began in London in September 2021, with Cynthia Addai-Robinson, Karan Soni, Dustin Milligan, Tony Goldwyn, Isaach de Bankolé, Jorma Taccone, and Julian Ovenden being announced as part of the cast that month.

Release
The film premiered on Amazon Prime Video on November 18, 2022.

Reception

References

External links
 

2022 comedy films
2020s American films
2020s English-language films
Amazon Prime Video original films
Amazon Studios films
American comedy films
FilmNation Entertainment films
Films about dysfunctional families
Films about weddings in the United Kingdom
Films based on American novels
Films directed by Claire Scanlon
Films set in England
Films shot in London
Works by the Molyneux sisters